
Year 272 BC was a year of the pre-Julian Roman calendar. At the time it was known as the Year of the Consulship of Cursor and Maximus (or, less frequently, year 482 Ab urbe condita). The denomination 272 BC for this year has been used since the early medieval period, when the Anno Domini calendar era became the prevalent method in Europe for naming years.

Events 
<onlyinclude>

By place

Seleucid Empire 
 The Seleucid king Antiochus I Soter is defeated by Egypt's Ptolemy II during the First Syrian War. Ptolemy II annexes Miletus, Phoenicia and western Cilicia from Antiochus. As a result, Ptolemy II extends Egyptian rule as far as Caria and into most of Cilicia.

Egypt 
 Egypt's victories solidify the kingdom's position as the undisputed naval power of the eastern Mediterranean; the Ptolemaic sphere of power now extends over the Cyclades to Samothrace, and the harbours and coastal towns of Cilicia Trachea, Pamphylia, Lycia and Caria.

Roman Republic 
 Pyrrhus' departure from southern Italy three years earlier leads to the Samnites finally being conquered by the Romans. With the surrender of Tarentum, the cities of Magna Graecia in southern Italy come under Roman influence and become Roman allies. Rome now effectively dominates all of the Italian peninsula.

Greece 
 Cleonymus, a Spartan of royal blood who has been outcast by his fellow Spartans, asks the King of Macedonia and Epirus, Pyrrhus, to attack Sparta and place him in power. Pyrrhus agrees to the plan, but intends to win control of the Peloponnese for himself. As a large part of the Spartan army led by king Areus I is in Crete at the time, Pyrrhus has great hopes of taking the city easily, but the citizens organise stout resistance, allowing one of Antigonus II's commanders, Aminias the Phocian, to reach the city with a force of mercenaries from Corinth. Soon after this, the Spartan king, Areus, returns from Crete with 2,000 men. These reinforcements stiffen Spartan resistance and Pyrrhus, finding that he is losing men to desertion every day, breaks off the attack and starts to plunder the country.
 As they plunder the countryside, Pyrrhus and his troops move onto Argos. Entering the city with his army by stealth, Pyrrhus finds himself caught in a confused battle with the Argives (who are supported by Antigonus' forces) in the narrow city streets. During the confusion an old woman watching from a rooftop throws a roof tile at Pyrrhus which stuns him, allowing an Argive soldier to kill him.
 Following his death in Argos, Pyrrhus is succeeded as king of Epirus by his son Alexander II while Antigonus II Gonatas regains his Macedonian throne which he has lost to Pyrrhus two years earlier.

India 
 The Mauryan emperor, Bindusara, sends the Mauryan army to conquer the southern kingdoms. Kadamba is conquered.

Births

Deaths 
 Aristotimus, Greek tyrant of Elis (approximate date)
 Bindusara, emperor of the Mauryan Empire (b. c. 320 BC)
 Ptolemy, son of Pyrrhus of Epirus (b. 295 BC)
 Pyrrhus of Epirus, king of the Molossians (from c. 297 BC), Epirus (306–301 and 297–272 BC) and Macedon (288–284 and 273–272 BC); involved in disputes in southern Italy against Rome and in Sicily (b. 318 BC)

References